Filippo Carandini (6 September 1729 - 28 August 1810) was an Italian Roman Catholic cardinal.

Biography
He was born in Pesaro to the aristocratic Carandini family. He was elevated to Cardinal in January 1787. He participated in the Papal Conclave of 1799-1800, held in Venice.

In 1790, he accused prince Sigismondo Chigi of trying to poison him in retribution for the cardinal having counseled his second wife, Donna Giovanna Medici di Ottaiano to abandon her new husband. For this, Chigi employed two men Sebastiani and Bandini to poison the cardinal; the plot was uncovered, and Chigi lived in exile in Padua til 1793. Carandini was a close friend of Pompeo Batoni.

References

Bibliography

 Bressan, Dino, and Ronald T. Ridley. The Prince as Poisoner: The Trial of Sigismondo Chigi, Rome 1790. Studi e Testi, 494. Città del Vaticano: Biblioteca Apostolica Vaticana, 2015.

1729 births
1810 deaths
19th-century Italian cardinals
People from Pesaro
Cardinals created by Pope Pius VI
Carandini family